Derek Morris may refer to:
Sir Derek Morris (academic), Provost of Oriel College, Oxford
Derek Morris (ice hockey) (born 1978), Canadian ice hockey defenceman
Derek Morris (jockey), 1990s UK and Irish based steeplechase rider in Adonis Juvenile Novices' Hurdle
Derek Morris, fictional character on Australian soap opera Neighbours
Derek Morris, fictional character on American teen sitcom Saved by the Bell

See also
Derrick Morris (died 2005), Europe's longest-surviving heart transplant patient
DJ Derek (Derek Serpell-Morris, 1941-2016), British DJ